The Autovía BU-30 is a Spanish ring road that goes around the city of Burgos. Its principal role is that cars from Madrid, Valladolid, León, Santander, Logroño or Vitoria don't need to cross Burgos. It has a total length of 37.5 km, and some sections of the autovía are also part of European route E05 or European route E80

Sections

References 

BU-30
BU-30